The Supreme Council of the Republic of Uzbekistan (Uzbek: O'zbekiston Respublikasi Oliy Kengashi) which lasted from 1991 to 1994 was the immediate continuation of the Supreme Soviet of the Uzbek SSR. The Supreme Council of the Republic of Uzbekistan was dissolved on December 25, 1994, and was officially succeeded by the Oliy Majlis. The last Chairman of the Supreme Council was Shavkat Yuldashev who served from 1991 to 1993.

References 

Historical legislatures
Post-Soviet states
1990s establishments in Uzbekistan